Howard Oliver Drinkwater Read (born 1984) is a British screenwriter, comedian, and animator best known for his work with his animated sidekick, Little Howard. His other creations include an angry manager with a conversational style and the worldview of Bernard Manning, Roger T. Pigeon, and H:BOT 2000, a robot from the future. Each of these characters interacts with both Big Howard and each other.

Howard Read is also known for his on-stage human Guess Who? act: the audience guesses who he has drawn on a large pad of paper, sitting down as their questions exclude those of a certain appearance until only one person is left standing.

In 1993, Howard Read invented NikNakNoodles - an amalgamation of Golden Wonder's Pot Noodle and Golden Wonder's other oddly-flavored product,
Nik Naks. Unfortunately, the product was never mass-produced. 

Read is a regular contributor to Robin Ince's Book Club.

Read also went on to work as a writer for the Disney XD series Counterfeit Cat and is also a writer for the new Danger Mouse series on CBBC.

Little Howard 
Little Howard is a sketched cartoon child aged 6 who is a "standing-up comedian". He appears on a laptop or projection screen except on his own TV show, interacting either with Big Howard, the audience, or with other animated characters (including the pigeon Roger, his manager, and H:BOT 2000 (named as MOTHER on Little Howard's Big Question), a computer). He is adept at interrupting Big Howard, dealing with hecklers and doing tarot readings with a pack of Top Trumps. His favorite food is fish and chips and he is currently learning the ukulele.

Edinburgh Festival Fringe
The Big Howard and Little Howard Show was nominated for a Perrier Award at the 2003 Edinburgh Festival Fringe.

In 2005, Read staged his own Comeback Special where he performed his first solo Festival show.

Writing Credits
 2021 Horrible Histories Podcast
 2021 Horrible histories 9 (covid-safe mini series) (Lion TV/CBBC) Sketch and song-writer.
 2019-21 It's Pony Series 2 (Blue Zoo/Nickelodeon) 
 2018-2021 Deer Squad Series 1 & 2 (NICK jnr/IQIYI)
 2018-2020 The Rabbids Invasion Mars (Ubisoft/France Télévision/Netflix)
 2019-2020 Horrible histories 9 (lion tv/CBBC) (filming delayed by Covid pandemic)
 2019 I Don’t Wanna Grow Up (HARE AND TORTOISE/FREEMANTLE) Created, co-writer and performer
 2019-2020 Family Jewels (Wildseed Studios) Pilot script for adult animation series
 2018-2019 The Blackpool Museum Project, Development writer and animated character bible author.
 2019 Ninja Express (CBBC/Boomerang)
 2019 Incredible Ant (Wildseed Studios/iQiyi)
 2019 Not The End Of The World (Wildseed studios/Sky)
 2019 "Horrible Histories 8" (Lion TV/CBBC) BAFTA NOMINATED as part of Best Writer team and WINNER BEST CHILDREN'S COMEDY BAFTA
 2018 "Super Natural" (King Bert) Development, sketch and song writer.
 2018 "Totems" (A Productions/Sesame Studios/Apple TV)
 2018 "The World's Worst Children" (King Bert) development writer
 2016-19 "Dennis And Gnasher Unleashed" (Beano Studios/CBBC) 
 2016 Horrible Histories 7 (Lion TV/CBBC), BAFTA NOMINATED as part of Best Writer team
 2016 "The Floogals" (Sprout/Channel 5)
 2012 - 2015 "Horrible Histories 5 - 6" (Lion TV/CBBC)
 2016 "Danger Mouse" (Freemantle/CBBC) 
 2016 "The Furchester Hotel" (Sesame Studios/CBBC) 
 2015 "Class Dismissed" (CBBC)
 2015 "The Tracy Ulman Show" (Citrus/BBC)
 2015 "Counterfeit Cat" (Wildseed Studios/Disney XD)
 2015 "The Amazing World Of Gumball" (Cartoon Network)
 2013-14 "Gigglebiz" (Cbeebies) BAFTA winning live action pre-school sketch show
 2009-11 "Little Howard's Big Question" (CBBC) British Writer’s Guild Award-winning animated/live-action edu-sit-com. Creator, head-writer, song-writer and lead animator, 38 episodes.
 2003 "Celebdaq" (BBC3) Live action/animated celebrity comedy show. Creator, writer and animator of animated celebrity caricature sketch segments.
 2001 "Polar Bears In a Snowstorm" (BBC) BBC New Comedy Award-winning animated comedy short. Creator, writer, voice and animator.

TV credits
 2004 "Celebdaq" (BBC Choice/BBC3)
 2005 "The World Stands Up" (Paramount Comedy/BBC America)
 2005-06 Two Posh Old Men (UKTV G2)
 2006 "Stairlift To Heaven" (CBBC/BBC1)
 2007 Comedy Cuts (ITV2)
 2007 The Royal Variety Performance (ITV1)
 2009-12 Little Howard's Big Question (BBC1/CBBC/BBC2)

Theatre credits
 2002 Words and Pictures
 2003 The Big Howard and Little Howard Show
 2004 At Home With The Howards
 2005 The Little Howard Appeal
 2005 2005 Comeback Special
 2007 Little Howard And The Magic Pencil Of Life And Death
 2011 Aladdin
 2012 Little Howard's Big Show
 2013 Howard Read - Hide and Speak

Radio credits 
 2005 The Milk Run (Radio 1)
 2007 An A-Z Of The British Countryside (BBC 7)
 2007 Peacefully In Their Sleeps (Radio 4)

References

External links
 Official website
 Little Howard's Big Question page

British stand-up comedians
British animators
1984 births
Living people
Place of birth missing (living people)
20th-century British comedians
21st-century British comedians